The Twenty-Four Generals (武田二十四将, Takeda Nijūshi-shō) were just one of many historically famous groupings of battle commanders from Japan's Sengoku Period. These Twenty-Four were the most trusted companions of Takeda Shingen. A third of them died at the famous Battle of Nagashino in 1575 when they led the Takeda forces against Oda Nobunaga.
When Takeda Katsuyori committed suicide in 1582, declaring the end of the Takeda clan, only three of them were still serving under the Takeda.

List 
In artwork and other historical sources, there is some variation in the list of names.

 Akiyama Nobutomo – Takeda's second in command; granted more autonomy. d. 1575, following second siege of Iwamura Castle
 Amari Torayasu – d. Battle of Uedahara 1548
 Anayama Nobukimi – following Mikatagahara and Nagashino, allied with Tokugawa Ieyasu and aided in defeat of Takeda Katsuyori
 Baba Nobuharu – fought at Mikatagahara and commanded vanguard of the right wing of Takeda army at Nagashino, where he died.
 Hara Masatane – d. Battle of Nagashino 1575
 Hara Toratane – d. 1564
 Ichijō Nobutatsu – younger brother to Shingen, fought at Nagashino
 Itagaki Nobukata – d. Battle of Uedahara 1548
 Kōsaka Danjō Masanobu - played a major role in the fourth battle of Kawanakajima, but was not present at Nagashino
 Naitō Masatoyo d. Nagashino 1575
 Obata Masamori – led the largest contingent (500 cavalry in the center company) at Nagashino
 Obata Toramori – d. 1561, is recorded as having been wounded 40 times in 30 encounters
 Obu Toramasa d. 1565
 Oyamada Nobushige – fought at Kawanakajima, Mikatagahara, and Nagashino
 Saigusa Moritomo – d. Nagashino 1575
 Sanada Nobutsuna – d. Nagashino 1575
 Sanada Yukitaka – a castle lord in Shinano Province who submitted to Shingen
 Tada Mitsuyori d. 1563
 Takeda Nobukado – brother to Shingen, d. 1575
 Takeda Nobushige – younger brother to Shingen, d. fourth battle of Kawanakajima 1561
 Tsuchiya Masatsugu – fought at Mikatagahara, d. Nagashino 1575; his sons followed Takeda Katsuyori until his death at Temmokuzan in 1582
 Yamagata Masakage – fought at Mikatagahara and Yoshida, d. Nagashino 1575
 Yamamoto Kansuke - strategist of the fourth battle of Kawanakajima in 1561, died in that battle
 Yokota Takatoshi – d. Siege of Toishi 1550

In popular culture
During the Edo period, the twenty-four samurai leaders were a popular topic for ukiyo-e and bunraku.

In the computer game Shogun: Total War, there are 25 Takeda generals.

See also 
 Seven Spears of Shizugatake

References

Further reading
 Turnbull, Stephen (1998). The Samurai Sourcebook. London: Cassell & Co.

External links
 British Museum, No. 3 Yamamoto Kansuke Nyudo Dokisai Haruyuki 山本勘助入道道鬼蔡晴幸 / Koetsu yusho den Takeda-ke nijushi-sho 甲越勇將傳武田家廾四將 (Biographies of Heroic Generals of Kai and Echigo Provinces, Twenty-four Generals of the Takeda Clan)
 Museum of Fine Arts (Boston),  Portraits of the Twenty-four Generals of Kai Province (Kôshû nijûshi shô no shôzô)「甲州二十四将之肖像」

Lists of samurai
Samurai units
Takeda retainers